Parbury is a surname. Notable people with the surname include,

 Florence Tyzack Parbury (1881–1960), British socialite and musician
 George Parbury (1807–1881), British publisher
 Kathleen Parbury (1901–1986), British sculptor

See also
 Marbury (surname)